WXDX-FM (105.9 MHz) is a commercial radio station in Pittsburgh, Pennsylvania known as 105.9 The X.  It airs an alternative rock radio format and is owned by iHeartMedia. The studios and offices are in Foster Plaza on Holiday Drive in Green Tree, Pennsylvania, but using a Pittsburgh address.  WXDX is the flagship radio station of the Pittsburgh Penguins hockey team.

WXDX-FM has an effective radiated power (ERP) of 15,500 watts.  Its transmitter is located off Swanson Street in Pittsburgh's North Side, on a tower shared with KDKA-TV 2 and other FM stations.  WXDX-FM broadcast using HD Radio technology.

History

On January 1, 1961, the station signed on as WAZZ and later as WAMO-FM.  At first, it was powered at only 4,500 watts but later it had the most powerful FM signal coverage in Western Pennsylvania, broadcasting at 72,000 watts. At first, it simulcasted the same programming as its AM sister station, WAMO (now WAOB). WAMO-AM-FM served the Pittsburgh African-American community with R&B and soul music, as well as Black talk and news programming on weekdays, and religious shows on Sundays.

In the later 1960s, the FM station began separate programming, specializing in Urban contemporary music, with WAMO-AM-FM sometimes simulcasting on weekends.  Over the years, the station was branded as Hot 106 WAMO.

It also had various formats during its later years, which also included Disco music and Rhythmic Contemporary or "CHUrban".

On April 10, 1996, at 3 p.m., WAMO-FM swapped frequencies with WXDX-FM, with the urban format moving to 106.7 FM, while WXDX's alternative rock format moved to the more powerful 105.9 FM frequency.

WXDX-FM was one of six stations owned by Clear Channel Communications (now iHeartMedia) that dropped The Howard Stern Show in February 2004 (however, Stern would show up on WRKZ later that year). Howard began airing on WXDX in November 1995 (when it was still on 106.7 FM).

Since 2008, WXDX-FM has served as the home for sports talk host Mark Madden. The Mark Madden Show, outside of Penguins broadcasts, is often the station's highest rated programming.

Station staff

Past personalities
 Alan Cox: The Alan Cox Show. Alan Cox generated a sizable following after being hired to host afternoons in 1999. He replaced "The Howard Stern Show" in the morning in June 2004 and his contract was not renewed for financial reasons in 2006. Cox released three CDs while on the air at WXDX-FM Pittsburgh: "Alan Cox Sells Out", "Ribbed", and "Shadyside Bathroom Wall Blues".  He frequently performed at numerous comedy clubs throughout the area, and a portion of the proceeds from his CDs were donated to local charities. Cox left in 2006 to host The Morning Fix at WKQX (Q101) in Chicago. Currently, he hosts afternoons at WMMS in Cleveland, Ohio. 
 Tim Benz: Co-hosted the weekday morning show from 2006 until February 2014, when he became sports director for all Pittsburgh Clear Channel stations. Benz resigned as sports director in May 2014 to co-host a program on WEEI-FM in Boston with Lou Merloni and Christian Fauria.
 Tim Anglin: He was a part-time DJ and The X's Promotions Director (1998–2002)
 Paul Cramer: Was a weekend and swing shift jock on The X who came to the station from rival alternative WNRQ (The Revolution) and was one of the original "XX" DJs from the 1980s Pittsburgh alternative station WXXP.  He is the author of "The Encyclopedia of Modern Rock Artists".  An internet radio pioneer, Cramer created one of the first alternative rock internet stations (EAR.FM) in 1997.  While at The X, he programmed the music for the specialty show "Prehistoric X" which focused on alternative 1980s' music.
 Debbie "Buck" Wilde: Night jock from 1996 to 2002, currently hosting middays on Pittsburgh adult contemporary station WLTJ.
 Ditch: Evening jock until 1997, now at KUFO in San Diego.
 Alison "Ali Gheny" Castellini: Afternoon jock and Assistant Program Director from 1995 to 1997 at "WNRQ—the Revolution".  Known for antics such as giving away "Oceanfront condominiums in Idaho" on April Fools' Day, she was later recruited to be Program Director and Afternoon Jock at WXDX after the Viacom-Secret Comm-Entercom buy outs. It was this era that WXDX saw its greatest evolution and its on-air staff its greatest growth.  In 1997 she moved to Philadelphia to start up and host afternoons for Modern AC—"Max 95.7" WXXM.  There she simultaneously hosted the nationally syndicated show "Today's Women" as a "Lilith Fair" radio companion for United Station Radio Networks (a Dick Clark company).  Later she directed and oversaw CDNow.com's first forrays into online radio products and stations, which included the company purchase of Napster.com.  She later returned to "terrestrial" radio at Adult Alternative WXPN in Philadelphia where she hosted evenings on-air while associate producing syndicated "World Cafe".   She also managed the digital relationship the program had with Sirius Satellite Radio and booked all of the artists.  After 25 years in Radio and music, she now continues work starting up companies in other industries, consulting and teaching at Temple University.
 Grimm: Afternoon and evening jock.  Moved to Monday-Friday 3–7 p.m. slot when Alan Cox's show was moved to the mornings in 2004 and stayed in this time slot until August 2008.  Worked with Pittsburgh Penguins Radio on 105.9 HD2 as producer/co-host of "Penguins Live" (daily 9:00–11:30 am with Pittsburgh native Steve Mears hosting).  Also worked doing weekends at 93.7 The Fan and Star 100.7. He is currently the night host at 103.1 The Bear in Parkersburg, WV.
 Maxwell Slater "Max" Logan a.k.a. Benjamin Bornstein.  Afternoon jock until 1997.  Formerly heard on WEBN in Cincinnati, WMMS and WNCX in Cleveland and WLUP-FM in Chicago as host of The Maxwell Show.  Ironically, Alan Cox took over the afternoon drive shifts previously occupied by Max at both WXDX-FM in 1999 and at WMMS in Cleveland in 2009. Bornstein is currently off the air.
 Renae Ravey – Overnights, weekends, swing jock, also a former jock at WNRQ (The Revolution). She is currently cohost of The Woody Show, heard mornings on Alt 98.7 in Los Angeles.
 Mike Bocan – Former evening & weekend jock, and promotions director who worked until March 12, 2007, after an incident transpired during a phone call to Bob Grove, host of the Pittsburgh Penguins postgame show.
 Lenny Diana – Was the X's music director and host of Edge of the X from 2001–2008; also did the 7 pm – midnight shift weeknights during his last couple of years with the station.  He was Brand Manager for WLZX (LAZER 99.3) and Classic Rock WAQY (ROCK 102) in Springfield, Massachusetts and is currently Program Director at WTTS/ Indianapolis.
 Steve Stone (station promotional voice), a nationally known television and radio voice announcer. Steve Stone worked as the in-house creative director for WXDX-FM for three years, from 1996 to the end of 1999.  He went on to work at WXRK-FM in New York City, and eventually launched his own voiceover and audio production company.
 Megan Slater – Weekends and filled in on the weekdays; left the X in early 2008 to join WRKZ-FM, a rock station in Columbus, Ohio where she was the weekday mid-day host.  She moved to Q-FM 96 (WLVQ-FM) in Columbus, Ohio where she was the weekday mid-day host until May 3, 2010.
 Bob McLaughlin – Co-hosted mornings with Tim Benz until 2014, then became Mark Madden's producer, where he remained through January 2020.
 Russ "Whip" Rose – Started out hosting overnights in the mid-1990's, later moving to middays. Rose departed the station in 2021 to spend more time on his automotive business. He can still be heard weeknights on sister station WDVE.
 Brandy Richey – Hosted weekends and filled in weekdays until 2021.
 Katie O – Hosted weekends, weekday fill-in shifts, and the Sunday night program Edge of The X, until Spring 2021.

WXDX-FM HD2
WXDX broadcasts using HD Radio technology.  It had programming on its HD-2 digital subchannel beginning in 2006, launching a format focusing on Adult Album Alternative (Triple A) music.

In May 2009, as part of its renewal of Pittsburgh Penguins radio rights, WXDX and the Penguins announced that the HD2 subchannel would become a 24-hour channel devoted to Penguins coverage, billed as "Pittsburgh Penguins Radio."   It launched October 1, 2009, with local and nationally-originated Penguins and hockey coverage (including "NHL Live" and league commissioner Gary Bettman's weekly "NHL Hour"), rebroadcasts of classic Penguins games, and game broadcasts of the team's top farm club in Wilkes-Barre/Scranton.  The move made the Penguins the second North American professional sports team with their own terrestrial radio channel (after the NFL's Dallas Cowboys and their HD2 relationship with KRLD-FM).

In the fall of 2015, WXDX-HD2 dropped Penguins Radio 24/7 with music WXDX normally plays on their station (but still simulcast Penguins games) until late March 2016 when iHeart2000s began airing. That programming later moved over by WKST-HD2, and was replaced with Pride Radio, an LGBTQ service offered by iHeartRadio.

As of early 2020, WXDX is no longer broadcasting an HD2 subchannel.

References

External links
105.9 The X official website

XDX-FM
Modern rock radio stations in the United States
Radio stations established in 1948
IHeartMedia radio stations